Kayleigh Chetcuti (born 2 September 2000) is a Maltese footballer who plays as a midfielder for the Malta women's national team.

Career
Chetcuti has been capped for the Malta national team, appearing for the team during the UEFA Women's Euro 2021 qualifying cycle.

See also
List of Malta women's international footballers

References

2000 births
Living people
Maltese women's footballers
Women's association football midfielders
Malta women's international footballers
Malta women's youth international footballers